The red-crowned crane (Grus japonensis), also called the Manchurian crane or Japanese crane (the Chinese character '丹' means 'red', '頂/顶' means 'crown' and '鶴/鹤' means 'crane'), is a large East Asian crane among the rarest cranes in the world. In some parts of its range, it is known as a symbol of luck, longevity, and fidelity.

Description

Adult red-crowned cranes are named for a patch of red bare skin on the crown, which becomes brighter during the mating season. Overall, they are snow white in color with black on the wing secondaries, which can appear almost like a black tail when the birds are standing, but the real tail feathers are actually white. Males are black on the cheeks, throat, and neck, while females are pearly gray in these spots. The bill is olive green to a greenish horn, the legs are slate to grayish black, and the iris is dark brown. 

Juveniles are a combination of white, partly tawny, cinnamon brown, and rusty or grayish. The neck collar is grayish to coffee brown, the secondaries are dull black and brown, and the crown and forehead are covered with gray and tawny feathers. The primaries are white, tipped with black, as are the upper primary coverts. The legs and bill are similar to those of adults but lighter in color.
Across the large wingspan, the red-crowned crane measures . On average, it is the heaviest crane species, although both the sarus and wattled crane can grow taller and exceed this species in linear measurements.

Another study found the average weight of the species to be .

Range and habitat
In the spring and summer, the migratory populations of the red-crowned crane breed in Siberia (eastern Russia), north-eastern China and occasionally in north-eastern Mongolia (i.e., Mongol Daguur Strictly Protected Area). The breeding range centers in Lake Khanka, on the border of China and Russia. Later, in the fall, they migrate in flocks to the Korean Peninsula and east-central China to spend the winter. Vagrants have also been recorded in Taiwan. In addition to the migratory populations, a resident population is found in eastern Hokkaidō, Japan. This species nests in wetlands, marshes and rivers. In the wintering range, their habitat consists mainly of paddy fields, grassy tidal flats, and mudflats. In the flats, the birds feed on aquatic invertebrates, and, in cold, snowy conditions, the birds switch to mainly living on rice gleanings from the paddy fields.

Ecology and behaviour

Diet

Red-crowned cranes have a highly omnivorous diet, though the dietary preferences have not been fully studied. They eat rice, parsley, carrots, redbuds, acorns, buckwheat, and a variety of water plants. The animal matter in their diet consists of fish, including carp and goldfish, amphibians, especially salamanders, snails, crabs, dragonflies, small reptiles, shrimp and small birds.  The daily food requirement of adult red-crowned cranes is 750 g.

They seem to prefer a carnivorous diet, although rice is now essential to survival for wintering birds in Japan and grass seeds are another important food source. While all cranes are omnivorous, per Johnsgard, the two most common crane species today (the sandhill and common cranes) are among the most herbivorous species while the two rarest species (the red-crowned and whooping cranes) are perhaps the most carnivorous species. When feeding on plants, red-crowned cranes exhibit a preference for plants with a high content of crude protein and low content of crude fiber. In Hokkaido, fish such as Tribolodon, Pungitius, Sculpin and flatfish was major prey of adults, while chicks mostly feed on various insects. In Zhalong Nature Reserve, small fish less than 10cm, such as common carps, pond loach, and Chinese sleeper was mainly taken as well as aquatic invertebreas like pond snails, dragonflys, water beetles and large amount of plant matter. Elsewhere, mudflat crabs are locally important food source in Yellow River Delta.

They typically forage by keeping their heads close to the ground, jabbing their beaks into mud when they encounter something edible. When capturing fish or other slippery prey, they strike rapidly by extending their necks outward, a feeding style similar to that of the heron. Although animal prey can be swallowed whole, red-crowned cranes more often tear up large prey by grasping with their beaks and shaking it vigorously, eating pieces as they fall apart. Most foraging occurs in wet grasslands, cultivated fields, shallow rivers, or on the shores of lakes.

Migration

The population of red-crowned cranes in Japan is mostly non-migratory, with the race in Hokkaidō moving only  to its wintering grounds. Only the mainland population experiences a long-distance migration. They leave their wintering grounds in spring by February and are established on territories by April. In fall, they leave their breeding territories in October and November, with the migration fully over by mid-December.

Sociality
Flock sizes are affected by the small numbers of the red-crowned crane, and given their largely carnivorous diet, some feeding dispersal is needed in natural conditions. Wintering cranes have been observed foraging, variously, in family groups, pairs, and singly, although all roosting is in larger groups (up to 80 individuals) with unrelated cranes. By the early spring, pairs begin to spend more time together, with nonbreeding birds and juveniles dispersing separately. In circumstances where a crane violates these boundaries, it may be violently attacked.

Breeding

The red-crowned crane is monogamous and long-lived, with stable pair-bonding both within and between years, and believed to mate for life. The breeding maturity is thought to be reached at 3–4 years of age. All mating and egg-laying are largely restricted to April and early May. A red-crowned crane pair duets in various situations, helping to establish the formation and maintenance of the pair bond, as well as territorial advertisement and agonistic signaling. Both males and females may start a duet with the production of a start call, but the main part of the duet always began with a long male call. The pair moves rhythmically until they are standing close, throwing their heads back and letting out a fluting call in unison, often triggering other pairs to start duetting, as well. As it occurs year-round, the social implications of dancing are complex in meaning. However, dancing behavior is generally thought to show excitement in the species. Also, the performance of duet displays increased the probability of staying in a favorable area, supporting the hypothesis that duet displays function as a signal of joint resource defense in the flock.

Pairs are territorial during the breeding season. Most nesting territories are characterized by flat terrain, access to wetland habitat, and tall grasses. Sometimes, nests are built on the frozen surface of water, as frigid temperatures may persist well into nesting season. Nest building takes about a week. A majority of nests contains two eggs, though one to three have been recorded. 

Both sexes incubate the eggs for at least 30 days. They also both feed the young when they hatch. Staying in the nest for the first few weeks, the young start to follow their parents as they forage in marshes by around 3 months of age. By early fall, about 95 days after hatching, the young are fledged and are assured fliers by migration time. Although they can fly well, crane young remain together with their parents for around 9 months. Young cranes maintain a higher-pitched voice that may serve to distinguish them from outwardly similar mature birds, this stage lasting until the leave parental care. The average adult lifespan is around 30 to 40 years, with some specimens living to 75 years of age in captivity. It is one of the longest-living species of bird.

Interspecies interactions
The red-crowned crane is a big-sized bird and there are no natural predators within their wintering ground. With their height averaging 1.5 m (5 ft), their large size deters most predators. As a result, red-crowned cranes often react indifferently to the presence of other birds such as small raptors; with harriers, falcons, owls, and usually buzzards being allowed to hunt small prey near a crane nest without any of these parties harassing each other. However, birds more likely to be egg or nest predators, such as corvids, some buzzards, and various eagles, are treated aggressively and are threatened until they leave the crane's territory. Mammalian carnivores, including red foxes, badgers, raccoon dogs, martens, and domestic dogs which pose a threat to eggs and chicks, are attacked immediately, with the parent cranes attempting to jab them in the flanks until the predators leave the vicinitly. These small predators do not present any danger to chicks in the presence of adults and are chased away by the crane without difficulty. Larger predators such as gray wolves and large dogs can be repelled by aggressive crane pairs.

Occasionally, losses at the nest occur to some of the above predators. Introduced American mink on Hokkaidō are one of the most successful predators of eggs and nestlings. Also, immature and unwary subadult or even adult cranes may be ambushed killed by red foxes in Japan and leopard cats in South Korea, though this is rare reports, especially with adults. More often, these birds can easily defend themselves by using sharp beak or just fly away from danger.

Smaller white-naped cranes often nest near red-crowned cranes, but competition between these species for food in a common nesting area is lessened due to the greater portion of vegetation in the white-naped crane's diet. In cases where interactions turn aggressive between white-naped and red-crowned cranes, red-crowned cranes are dominant, as expected due to their considerably larger size. As reported researchers trying to band or examine the cranes or their nest, this powerful species is considered mildly hazardous and prone to respond quickly with considerable aggression to being approached or handled by humans and are able to inflict painful injuries using both its kicking feet and dagger-like beak.

Status

The population of red-crowned cranes is split into a migratory continental population in Korea, China, Mongolia and Russia (with all birds wintering in Korea and China), and a resident Japanese population in Hokkaidō. In 2020, winter counts recorded more than 3,800 red-crowned cranes (adults and immatures), including about 1,900 in Japan, more than 1,600 in Korea and about 350 in China. This indicates that there are around 2,300 adults overall. Whereas both the resident Japanese population and the migratory population that winters in Korea have increased in recent decades, the migratory population that winters in China has rapidly decreased. The main threats are habitat loss and fragmentation, but to a lesser extent also human disturbances near their nesting grounds, poisoning and poaching.

The National Aviary in Pittsburgh, Pennsylvania, ran a program where U.S. zoos donated eggs which were flown to Russia and raised in the Khinganski Nature Reserve and released into the wild. This program sent 150 eggs between 1995 and 2005.  The program has been put on hold to concentrate on different crane conservation programs in Russia, such as education and fire suppression. Several hundred red-crowned cranes are kept in zoos around the world. Assuredly, the international efforts of Russia, China, Japan, and Korea are needed to keep the species from extinction. The most pressing threat is habitat destruction, with a general lack of remaining pristine wetland habitats for the species to nest. In Japan, little proper nesting habitat remains and the local breeding population is close to the saturation point.

In South Korea, it has been designated natural monument 202 and a first-class endangered species.

Culture

China

In China, the red-crowned crane is often featured in myths and legends. In Taoism, the red-crowned crane is a symbol of longevity and immortality. In art and literature, immortals are often depicted riding on cranes. A mortal who attains immortality is similarly carried off by a crane. Reflecting this association, red-crowned cranes are called xian he. The red-crowned crane is also a symbol of nobility. Depictions of the crane have been found in Shang Dynasty tombs and Zhou Dynasty ceremonial bronzeware. A common theme in later Chinese art is the reclusive scholar who cultivates bamboo and keeps cranes. Some literati even reared cranes and trained them to dance to guqin music.

The Ming and Qing Dynasties endowed the Red Crowned Crane with the cultural connotation of loyalty, uprightness and noble morality. Red Crowned Crane is embroidered on the clothes of a civil servant. It is listed as an important symbol next only to the Loong and Fenghuang used by the royal family. Therefore, people also regard the crane as a symbol of a high official.

The image of Red Crowned Crane generally appears in Chinese cultural relics and works of art.Because of its importance in Chinese culture, the red-crowned crane was selected by the National Forestry Bureau of the People's Republic of China as a candidate for the title of national animal of China. This decision was deferred due to the red-crowned crane's Latin name translation as "Japanese crane".

Robert Kuok's Kerry/Kuok Group also uses the red-crowned crane as its logo for operations in Hong Kong, Singapore, PR China, and overseas.

Japan

In Japan, this crane is known as the tanchōzuru and is said to live for 1,000 years. A pair of red-crowned cranes was used in the design for the Series D 1000-yen note (reverse side). In the Ainu language, the red-crowned crane is known as sarurun kamuy or "marsh kamuy". At Tsurui, they are one of the 100 Soundscapes of Japan. Cranes are said to grant favours in return for acts of sacrifice, as in Tsuru no Ongaeshi ("crane's return of a favor").

Given its reputation, Jerry Huff, an American branding expert, recommended it as the international logo of Japan Airlines, after seeing a representation of it in a gallery of samurai crests. Huff wrote "I had faith that it was the perfect symbol for Japan Air Lines. I found that the crane myth was all positive—it mates for life (loyalty), and flies high for miles without tiring (strength).”

Korea

In Korea, the red-crowned crane is called durumi or hak and it is considered a symbol of longevity, purity, and peace. Korean seonbis regarded the bird as an icon of their constancy. The red-crowned crane is depicted on the South Korean 500 won coin and is the symbol of Incheon.

See also 
Wildlife of China
Wildlife of Japan
Wildlife of Korea
List of Special Places of Scenic Beauty, Special Historic Sites and Special Natural Monuments
Izumi crane migration grounds, for a protected place in Japan visited by many migratory crane species

References

Further reading

 Craft, Lucille. 1999. "Divided by Politics, United in Flight - Can Japan and Russia Resolve Their Differences Over the Remote Kuril Islands and Protect the Rare Red Crowned Crane?" International Wildlife. 29, no. 3: 22.
 Crane- Paul A. Johnsgaard (2011).

External links

 BirdLife Species Factsheet
 Red-crowned crane (International Crane Foundation)
 Three White Cranes, Two Flyways, One World An educational website that links schools along the eastern whooping crane flyway in the United States with schools along the eastern flyways of the Siberian and red-crowned cranes in Russia and China.
 Japanese Crane (Grus japonensis) from Cranes of the World (1983) by Paul Johnsgard

 
 

red-crowned crane
Birds of Japan
Birds of Korea
Birds of Manchuria
Hokkaido
red-crowned crane
Taxa named by Philipp Ludwig Statius Müller
Articles containing video clips